7 Ceti is a single, variable star in the equatorial constellation of Cetus. It has the variable star designation AE Ceti. The star is visible to the naked eye with a baseline apparent visual magnitude of 4.44. Based upon an annual parallax shift of only , it is located roughly 450 light years away. It is moving closer to the Sun with a heliocentric radial velocity of −23 km/s. Eggen (1965) listed it as a probable member of the Wolf 630 group of co-moving stars.

This is an aging red giant star with a stellar classification of M1 III, currently on the asymptotic giant branch. Samus et al. (2017) has it classed as a slow irregular variable of type LB:, and ranges in magnitude from 4.26 down to 4.46. Tabur et al. (2009) list it as a semiregular variable with four known periods ranging in frequency from 19.2 to 41.7 days. The stellar atmosphere of 7 Ceti has expanded to an estimated 54 times the Sun's radius. It is radiating around 1,019 times the Sun's luminosity from its enlarged photosphere at an effective temperature of 3,800 K.

References

M-type giants
Slow irregular variables
Semiregular variable stars
Cetus (constellation)
Ceti, 07
Durchmusterung objects
001038
001170
0048
Ceti, AE